Dussumieriidae is a family of clupeiform fishes popularly called the "round herrings".  It is now recognized by FishBase as a family in its own right; it had been considered to be a subfamily of Clupeidae.  It  contains two extant genera, and one extinct genus from the Ypresian of Monte Bolca.

References 
 

Clupeiformes
Marine fish families
Ray-finned fish families